Nancy Carman (born 1950) is an American ceramist.

Born in Tucson, Carman has also been active in San Francisco during her career. She earned her bachelor's degree from the University of California, Davis in 1972, following with a master of fine arts degree from the University of Washington in 1976; she also studied at the San Francisco Art Institute. Her work, largely figural in nature, is generally autobiographical. She received an Individual Craftsman's Grant from the National Endowment for the Arts in 1979, and is represented in the collection of the Renwick Gallery of the Smithsonian American Art Museum.

References

1950 births
Living people
American women ceramists
American ceramists
20th-century American artists
20th-century American women artists
21st-century American artists
21st-century American women artists
Artists from Tucson, Arizona
Artists from San Francisco
University of California, Davis alumni
San Francisco Art Institute alumni
University of Washington School of Art + Art History + Design alumni
20th-century ceramists
21st-century ceramists